Otto Bærentzen (31 May 1868 – 20 May 1943) was a Danish fencer. He competed at the 1920 and 1928 Summer Olympics.

References

1868 births
1943 deaths
Danish male fencers
Olympic fencers of Denmark
Fencers at the 1920 Summer Olympics
Fencers at the 1928 Summer Olympics
Sportspeople from Frederiksberg